Yoshiharu is a masculine Japanese given name.

Possible writings
Yoshiharu can be written using many different combinations of kanji characters. Here are some examples:

義治, "justice, to manage"
義春, "justice, spring" 
義温, "justice, to warm up"
吉治, "good luck, to manage"
吉春, "good luck, spring"
吉温, "good luck, to warm up"
善治, "virtuous, to manage"
善春, "virtuous, spring"
芳治, "virtuous/fragrant, to manage"
芳春, "virtuous/fragrant, spring"
良治, "good, to manage"
良春, "good, spring"
慶治, "congratulate, to manage"
由治, "reason, to manage"
与志治, "give, determination, to manage"
嘉治, "excellent, to manage"
嘉温, "excellent, to warm up"

The name can also be written in hiragana よしはる or katakana ヨシハル.

Notable people with the name

, Japanese musician and record producer
, Japanese shōgun
, Japanese alpine skier
, Japanese shogi and chess player
, Japanese footballer and manager
, Japanese daimyō
, Japanese educator
Yoshiharu Kohayakawa (小早川 美晴, born 1963), Japanese-Brazilian mathematician
Yoshiharu Osaka (大阪 可治, born 1947), Japanese karateka
, Japanese daimyō
, Japanese surgeon, explorer, travel writer, photographer and anthropologist
, Japanese sumo wrestler
, Japanese sprinter
, Japanese manga artist and writer
, Japanese footballer
, Japanese rugby union player

Japanese masculine given names